Timing failure is a failure of a process, or part of a process, in a synchronous distributed system or real-time system to meet limits set on execution time, message delivery, clock drift rate, or clock skew.

Asynchronous distributed systems cannot be said to have timing failures as guarantees are not provided for response times.

Distributed computing problems
Real-time computing